The Men's heptathlon event  at the 2009 European Athletics Indoor Championships was held on March 7–8.

Medalists

Results

References
Results

Combined events at the European Athletics Indoor Championships
2009 European Athletics Indoor Championships